Kilwa Masoko or Masoko is an administrative ward in Kilwa District of Lindi Region in Tanzania. 
The ward is also the capital of Kilwa District. According to the 2012 census, the ward has a total population of 13,601.

History 
For over a millennia the Kilwa Masoko area was originally inhabited by the Mwera people. However, in the 10th to 16th century the area was part of the Swahili city states that spanned along the East African coast based at the  prosperous Swahili city of Kilwa Kisiwani across the Kilwa sound. The name Masoko means  "markets" in the Swahili language. The town of Kilwa Masoko as we know today was established as the seat for Kilwa district after the British in 1918 and they built a deep water port at the site for their vessels. When Tanganyika became independent in 1961, the government chose to keep Kilwa Masoko as the district seat. In 2008, the town got its own government from a ward to a township authority.

Geography 
The town of Kilwa Masoko is located at the tip of the Kilwa Peninsula 300 km south of Dar es Salaam. Across east from the Kilwa sound is the Island of Kilwa Kisiwani. To the south of the peninsula is the Mavuji River.

Demographics 
According to the 2012 Tanzania National Census, the population of the Kilwa Masoko was 13,601 of which 6,462 were male and 7,139 were female. Most residents of Kilwa district practice Sunni Islam. Kilwa Masoko has one of the smallest household sizes in Kilwa district with 3.9 people per household.

Economy 
The economy of Kilwa Masoko is primarily based on government administration and Cultural tourism. On nearby Kilwa Kisiwani island there are ancient Swahili ruins which were declared a UNESCO World Heritage Site in 1981, and is only accessible by boat through from the port of Kilwa Masoko. Other economic activities include fishing and small scale urban agriculture within the town. The town hosts a few number of hotels for guests and tourists.

Arts & Culture 
The culture of Kila Masoko is mostly Swahili culture with a mix of traditional Mwera customs and values.

Historic Buildings 
See: Kilwa Kisiwani  

Historic building located within Kilwa Masoko Township include Great Mosque of Kilwa, a rapidly deteriorating mosque built using Swahili architecture in the Middle Ages in the height of Swahili civilization. Husuni Kubwa is a palace in ruins that once hosted the sultan of Kilwa. Kilwa Fort , a fort built by the portuguese after the sacking of Kilwa. Husuni Ndogo is a small fort with the exact use for it remain unknown. More buildings are at Songo Mnara Island, that are yet to be uncovered.

Government & Infrastructure 
Kilwa Masoko is a town that is governed by town authority structure with a Township Executive Officer (TEO).  The  Kilwa Masoko township authority is divided administratively into 9 hamlets: 

 Mpara
 Lupedile
 Mkwanyule
 Kisangi
 Muchomalo
 Mnazi Mmoja
 Miembe-miwili
 Masoko
 Kisiwani

Transportation 
Kilwa Masoko is served by a deep water port located at the southern tip of the town. The town is served by air through the Kilwa Masoko Airport (KIY) and is connected to the National Highway B2 through Kilwa road. Also Kilwa is served by major regional buses to and from Dar es Salaam and Mtwara.

Education & Health 
Schools located in Kilwa Masoko Township Authority:

 Mnazi Mmoja Primary School
 Kilwa Secondary School
 Kilwa Primary School
 Masoko Primary school
 Kilwa Islamic Secondary School
 Iyahi Koranic Middle School (Kilwa Kisiwani)
 Kilwa Masoko Adult Education Training Center
 Ukombozi Primary school

Healthcare centers located in Kiswal masoko Township Authority:

 Masoko Urban Health Center
 The Kilwa Masoko BAKWATA Dispensary.

External links
World Monuments Fund Project Page for Kilwa
Tanzanian NGO working in Kilwa promoting scientific research
Mpingo Conservation & Development Initiative
Free resource for tourists on Kilwa

References

Wards of Kilwa District